Kostiantyn Domaratskyi (born 27 June 2000) is a professional Ukrainian football midfielder.

Career
Domaratskyi is a product of the Karpaty Lviv youth sportive school and in August 2019 he signed a contract with Ukrainian side SC Dnipro-1 and played for its in the Ukrainian Premier League Reserves and Under 19 Championship. 

In December 2020 he was promoted to the main squad to play in the Ukrainian Premier League. Domaratskyi made his debut in the Ukrainian Premier League for SC Dnipro-1 as a second-half substituted player on 6 December 2020, playing in a losing away match against FC Zorya Luhansk.

References

External links
Statistics at UAF website (Ukr)

2000 births
Living people
Sportspeople from Lviv
Ukrainian footballers
SC Dnipro-1 players
Ukrainian Premier League players
Association football midfielders